Fraisthorpe is a village and former civil parish, now in the parish of Barmston, in the East Riding of Yorkshire, England. It lies to the east of the A165 road.

Up to 2009, Fraisthorpe beach was used to hold a yearly Elim Pentecostal Church youth and family camp. In 1891 the parish had a population of 95.

Within Fraisthorpe is the Grade II listed Anglican chapel dedicated to St Edmund. Originally 13th century, it was remodelled in 1893 by Smith and Brodrick. The chancel and nave are unified, and constructed of rubble and cobble.

History 

In 1823 Fraisthorpe was written as "Fraysthorpe". It was in the parish of Carnaby and the Wapentake of Dickering. Occupations at the time included two farmers. In 1866 it became a separate parish, on 1 April 1896 the parish was abolished to form Fraisthorpe with Auburn and Wilsthorpe.

See also
 Fraisthorpe Wind Farm

References

External links

Villages in the East Riding of Yorkshire
Former civil parishes in the East Riding of Yorkshire